Kirill Valeryevich Zhandarov (born 29 March 1983) is a Russian actor of theater, cinema and TV. He is a  best known for roles in television series The White Guard (as Strashkevich) and Brief Guide To A Happy Life (as Sergey).

Biography
Zhandarov was born on March 29, 1983, in the town of Lomonosov (Petrodvortsovy District of Leningrad).

In 2004, he graduated from the Saint Petersburg State Theatre Arts Academy (SPbGATI, Sergey Parshin course).

In 2004-2005, he worked in Moscow at the Roman Viktyuk Theater. Since 2006, he has been an actor in the Tovstonogov Bolshoi Drama Theater.

References

External links
 
 Official web site
 Джентльмен удачи Кирилл Жандаров
 Zhandarov's page on website of the Tovstonogov Bolshoi Drama Theater
 Сын Кирилла Жандарова разбирает на части вентиляторы

1983 births
Living people
People from Lomonosov
Male actors from Saint Petersburg
Russian male television actors
Russian male film actors
Russian male stage actors
21st-century Russian male actors